The Korean Children's Union (KCU) is the precursor to the Socialist Patriotic Youth League of North Korea contributing to North Korean youth movement and pioneer movement. It is for children aged six to fifteen and is a political organisation linked to the Workers' Party of Korea. Its uniformed branch is known as the Young Pioneer Corps (which also includes cadets from the Red Flag Mangyongdae Revolutionary School), which admits children and pre-teens ages nine to 15. The organization operates chapters in elementary and secondary schools nationwide. It teaches children about Juche, and other ideologies behind the North Korean system. Youth above the age of 15 may join the Socialist Patriotic Youth League.

Prospective members are usually welcomed formally on an important public holiday such as the Day of the Sun, the Military Foundation Day, or the Day of the Foundation of the Republic. It is considered an important occasion in a child's life. On such days, kindergarten-grade children are officially admitted and red neckerchiefs and pins handed out. Third graders from primary schools are usually welcomed into the KCU on investiture ceremonies on these days.

See also
 Socialist Patriotic Youth League
 Ernst Thälmann Pioneer Organisation
 Vladimir Lenin All-Union Pioneer Organization

References

Further reading
 

Workers' Party of Korea
Pioneer movement
Youth organizations based in North Korea